Susannah Grant (born January 4, 1963) is an American screenwriter, director, and producer.

Life and career
Grant was born in New York City. She studied at Amherst College and attended the AFI Conservatory. From 1994 to 1997 she worked on television as the producer and major writer of the Fox drama series Party of Five. She wrote the screenplays for Ever After, Erin Brockovich, directed by Steven Soderbergh,  28 Days, and Disney's Pocahontas. For Erin Brockovich she received an Oscar nomination in 2001.

After her  Academy Award nomination, Grant adapted In Her Shoes and Charlotte's Web for the screen and wrote and directed Catch and Release, starring Jennifer Garner and Timothy Olyphant. She is also a Miss Porter's School alumna as well as an Amherst College alumna, having graduated in 1984. She later was accepted to the American Film Institute and received the Nicholl Fellowship in screenwriting. Grant was featured in The Dialogue.

Grant created and produced the CBS series A Gifted Man in 2011. She received the Valentine Davies Award in 2011. In September 2013, Grant delivered a screenwriting lecture as part of the BAFTA and BFI Screenwriters' Lecture Series. In 2014, Grant created the ABC drama series Members Only for the 2014–15 American television season.

In 2019, Grant co-created, wrote and directed the Netflix miniseries Unbelievable, starring Kaitlyn Dever and Toni Collette, adapted from real events. More recently, she signed a first look deal with Lionsgate Television. Grant will write and direct Netflix film Lonely Planet starring Laura Dern and Liam Hemsworth.

Personal life
Grant has been married to Christopher Henrikson since 1995, and they have two children.

Filmography

Film

Television

References

External links
The Don and Gee Nicholl Fellowships in Screenwriting

1963 births
American women film directors
AFI Conservatory alumni
Television producers from New York City
American women television producers
American television writers
Amherst College alumni
Living people
American women screenwriters
American women television writers
Writers from New York City
Film directors from New York City
Screenwriters from New York (state)
Miss Porter's School alumni
20th-century American writers
21st-century American writers
20th-century American women
21st-century American women